At the end of each AFC Asian Cup final tournament, several awards are presented to the players and teams which have distinguished themselves in various aspects of the match.

Awards 
There are currently five post-tournament awards
 the Most Valuable Player for best player;
 the Top Goalscorer for most prolific goal scorer;
 the Best Goalkeeper  for most outstanding goalkeeper; 
 the Team of the Tournament for best combined team of players at the tournament;
 the Fair Play Award for the team with the best record of fair play.

Most Valuable Player

Top Goalscorer

Best Goalkeeper

Team of the Tournament

Fair Play Award
First awarded in 1984

See also 
 FIFA World Cup awards
 UEFA European Championship awards
 Copa América awards
 Africa Cup of Nations awards
 CONCACAF Gold Cup awards
 OFC Nations Cup awards

References

AFC Asian Cup